"Order More" is a hip hop song by American rapper G-Eazy. It features  vocals from Starrah. It was released on November 13, 2015 from his second studio album When It's Dark Out. The song was produced by DJ Spinz. The official remix features additional verses by Lil Wayne and Yo Gotti.

Music video
The song has two accompanying music videos. The first one was released on February 16, 2016. The second one premiered on February 18, 2016 on G-Eazy's YouTube account on Vevo.

The video shows G-Eazy enjoying the company of women at a house most of the video. Marty Grimes also makes an appearance.

The video was shot at James Goldstein's mansion and features Goldstein. In Brazil "Order More" won a non-commercial version of Rapper Luciano D10.

Charts

Weekly charts

Certifications

References

External links

2015 singles
2015 songs
G-Eazy songs
RCA Records singles
Songs written by Starrah
Songs written by Southside (record producer)
Songs written by DJ Spinz
Songs written by G-Eazy